End Games is a 2007 novel by Michael Dibdin. It is the 11th and last entry in the Aurelio Zen series.

Plot
Police detective Aurelio Zen is posted to remote Calabria, at the toe of the Italian boot. Beneath the surface of a tight-knit, traditional community, he discovers that violent forces are at work. There has been a brutal murder and Zen is determined to find a way to penetrate the code of silence, to uncover the truth, but his assignment is complicated by another secret which has drawn strangers from the other side of the world - a hunt for ancient buried treasure, launched by a single-minded player with millions to spend pursuing his bizarre and deadly obsession.

Commentary
According to Barry Forshaw,
"In the past, Dibdin ensured that Zen repeatedly came up against a wall of silence, but none more implacable than that he encounters here. As the detective slowly but surely peels away the layers of mystery and obfuscation, he is forced to confront the very basis of the concepts by which he has tried to maintain his career: honesty, a sense of justice and firm notions of right and wrong. As always with this writer, the sense of locale is conjured up with maximum vividness, and the final effect of reading the book that writes finish to the careers of both Aurelio Zen and the man who created him is twofold: we are grateful that this final entry is a distinguished one, but saddened that we will never again go down those mean Italian streets that Zen led us down – at least not with Michael Dibdin as our guide..."

2007 British novels
Novels by Michael Dibdin
Calabria
Faber and Faber books